Yasuhiko Arakawa (Japanese , Arakawa Yasuhiko; born 6 November 1952) is a Japanese physicist.

His research focuses on semiconductor physics, including growth of nanostructures and their optoelectronic applications. Among his main achievements are the proposal of the concept of quantum dots and their application to quantum dot lasers, the observation of exciton-polariton Rabi-splitting in a semiconductor microcavity, or, recently, the first 3D photonic crystal nanocavity lasers with quantum dot gain.

Biography
Yasuhiko Arakawa received a B.S. degree in 1975 and a Ph.D. degree in 1980, respectively, from the University of Tokyo, both in Electronics Engineering. In 1981 he became an Assistant Professor at the University of Tokyo and in 1993, was promoted Full Professor there. He is now at the Institute of Industrial Science, the University of Tokyo and is also the Director of Institute for Nano Quantum Information Electronics. He has been a visiting scientist of the California Institute of Technology in the period 1984-1986 and visiting Professor at the Technical University of Munich in the period 2009-2011. 

He has been a member of the Science Council of Japan since 2009.

He was also elected as a member into the National Academy of Engineering in 2017 for contributions to quantum dot lasers and related nanophotonic devices.

Awards
Niwa Memorial Award
Excellent Paper Award des IECE
Young Scientist Award
International Symposium on GaAs and Related Compound Semiconductors
IBM Award
Distinguished Achievement Award des IEICE
Hattori Hoko Award
Sakura-Kenjiro Award von OITDA
Electronics Award from IEICE
Nissan Science Award
2004 Esaki Award (with Hiroyuki Sakaki)
2009 IEEE David Sarnoff Award
2010 NEC C&C Foundation Awards 2010 C&C Prize
2019 IEEE Jun-ichi Nishizawa Medal

References

External links
University of Tokyo: Arakawa & Iwamoto Laboratory
Entry on Tech Heroes

20th-century births
Living people
Japanese physicists
University of Tokyo alumni
Academic staff of the University of Tokyo
Academic staff of the Technical University of Munich
Year of birth missing (living people)
Optical physicists